Calliope "Callie" Thorne is an American actress known for her role as Dr. Dani Santino on the USA Network series Necessary Roughness. She is also known for past work such as her roles on Homicide: Life on the Street as Detective Laura Ballard, a role she held for two seasons, and the movie Homicide: The Movie, as well as for playing Sheila Keefe on Rescue Me and Elena McNulty in The Wire.

Life and career
Thorne was born in Boston, Massachusetts of Armenian and English descent. She studied theater and dramatic literature at Wheaton College in Norton, Massachusetts and at the Lee Strasberg Theatre and Film Institute in New York City.

In addition to Rescue Me, Thorne has made guest appearances on television series such as ER (2005–2006), Law & Order: Criminal Intent (Silver Lining, (2004), Law & Order: Special Victims Unit (2003–2019), The Wire (2002–2008), Prison Break (2006), Royal Pains (2009), White Collar (2009), Burn Notice (2009–2010), Californication (2011), and Elementary (2012) among others.

In 1996, Thorne co-starred in the romantic comedy Ed's Next Move. In 1997 and 1998, she appeared as Det. Laura Ballard on the television series Homicide: Life on the Street and its subsequent TV movie. She has also had many small roles in film and TV movies and starred in the 1998 film, Chocolate for Breakfast.

She was the lead in the USA Network series Necessary Roughness, which premiered on June 29, 2011. She received a Golden Globe nomination for "Best Actress" for her role. The series remained on the air for three seasons. In 2012, she won Outstanding Female Actor in a Leading Role in a Drama Series at the Gracie Allen Awards for her role.

Thorne has also done work on stage, such as in the off-Broadway play The Country Club (1999), with Cynthia Nixon. Additionally, she appeared with Eric Bogosian and Sam Rockwell in The Last Days of Judas Iscariot (2005), directed by Philip Seymour Hoffman. In 2015 she was set to portray Emme Haladjian in a TNT horror series entitled Breed.

Thorne portrayed Captain Nancy Santiani on the NBC police procedural drama The Mysteries of Laura.  She left The Mysteries of Laura in 2016.

In a recurring role on NCIS: New Orleans she portrayed a nemesis of character Dwayne Pride.

Filmography

Film

TV

References

External links

 
 

Actresses from Boston
American film actresses
American people of Armenian descent
American people of English descent
American television actresses
Living people
People from Sudbury, Massachusetts
Wheaton College (Massachusetts) alumni
21st-century American actresses
20th-century American actresses
Year of birth missing (living people)